ScotRail is a train operating company in Scotland started in April 2022.

ScotRail also refers to a number of rail firms that have operated trains in Scotland under the ScotRail brand beginning in September 1983, which include:

 ScotRail (British Rail), division of British Rail that operated trains in Scotland from September 1983 until March 1997
 ScotRail (National Express), train operating company that operated the franchise from March 1997 until October 2004
 First ScotRail, train operating company that operated the franchise from October 2004 until March 2015
 Abellio ScotRail, train operating company that operated the franchise from April 2015 until March 2022